Lotts Creek is a stream in Ringgold County, Iowa and Harrison and Worth counties in Missouri. It is a tributary of the East Fork of the Grand River.

The stream flows generally southwest passing into the northwest corner of Harrison County, Missouri just north of the community of Hatfield. The stream continues to the southwest entering Worth County and reaching its confluence with the East Fork just west of the city of Allendale.

A variant name was "Lots Creek". The creek has the name of Henry , a pioneer citizen.

See also
List of rivers of Iowa
List of rivers of Missouri

References

Rivers of Harrison County, Missouri
Rivers of Worth County, Missouri
Rivers of Ringgold County, Iowa
Rivers of Iowa
Rivers of Missouri